Parke may refer to:

People

 Benjamin Parke, 19th-century lawyer, soldier and politician in Indiana
 Evan Parke, Jamaican actor
 Henry Parke (1790–1835), English architect
 Hervey Parke, Parke-Davis partner
 James Parke, 1st Baron Wensleydale, British barrister and judge
 John Parke (disambiguation), multiple people
 Maria Frances Parke (1772–1822), English composer
 Walter Parke (1891–1914), English cricketer and British Army officer
 William Parke (director) (1873–1941), American film director
 William Thomas Parke (1761–1847), English oboist

Places

 Parke County, Indiana
 Parke Township, Clay County, Minnesota
 Parke, Bovey Tracey, an historic estate in Devon

Sport

 Parke-Keelogues-Crimlin, also known as Parke GAA, Gaelic football club in County Mayo, Ireland

See also 
 Park (disambiguation)
 Parkes (disambiguation)